Gulbene Municipality is a municipality in Vidzeme, Latvia. The municipality was formed in 2009 by merging Beļava parish, Dauksti parish, Druviena parish, Galgauska parish, Jaungulbene parish, Lejasciems parish, Litene parish, Lizums parish, Līgo parish, Ranka parish, Stāmeriena parish, Stradi parish, Tirza parish and Gulbene town the administrative centre being Gulbene. The population in 2020 was 19,771.

Images

See also 
 Administrative divisions of Latvia (2009)

References 

 
Municipalities of Latvia
Vidzeme